Church of Holy Trinity is an Anglican church and Grade I Listed building in Barrow upon Humber, North Lincolnshire, England.

Architecture
The arcades and chancel date to the 13th century, the tower and aisle are 14th-15th century. The building was restored in the 19th century: in 1841, 1856, and 1868-69 (the latter of which by Kirk and Parry) which involved the rebuilding of the north aisle, the south porch, the roofs of the aisle and the chancel.

Monuments
Monuments in the chancel include a wall tablet to William Broxholme of 1684, a marble wall tablet to Roger Uppleby of 1780, and a marble wall tablet to George Uppleby of 1816.

Gallery

References

13th-century church buildings in England
Church of England church buildings in Lincolnshire
Grade I listed churches in Lincolnshire
Borough of North Lincolnshire
13th-century establishments in England